is a Japanese Paralympic swimmer competing mainly in category S11 events.

Career
Junichi has competed in five summer paralympics winning a total of 21 medals, five gold nine silver and seven bronze.  His first games came in 1992 when he competed in the 400m freestyle and won bronze in the 100m backstroke, 200m backstroke and 200m Medley and silver in both the 50m and 100m freestyle.  In 1996 in Atlanta he competed in the 100m breaststroke and butterfly and won bronze in the 200m Medley, silver in the 100m backstroke and gold in both the 50m and 100m freestyle.  In the 2000 Summer Paralympics he defended his 50m freestyle title but slipped to second in the 100m freestyle but also won a gold as part of the Japanese 4 × 100 m medley team and added a further two silver medals in the 100m backstroke and 200m medley.  2004 would see him win his third consecutive gold at the 50m freestyle, he also won silvers in the 100m butterfly and freestyle and bronze in the 100m backstroke and the 4 × 100 m freestyle as well as competing in the 200m medley and 4 × 100 m medley.  In his fifth games in 2008 he lost out to Spaniard Enhamed Enhamed in the 50m freestyle, losing for the first time in 4 games in the 50m freestyle he added a bronze in the 100m butterfly as well as competing in the 100m backstroke.

Awards and honours
In 2016, Junichi was inducted into the Paralympic Hall of Fame.

References

External links 
 

Year of birth missing (living people)
Living people
Japanese male backstroke swimmers
Japanese male butterfly swimmers
Japanese male freestyle swimmers
Japanese male medley swimmers
Paralympic swimmers of Japan
Paralympic gold medalists for Japan
Paralympic silver medalists for Japan
Paralympic bronze medalists for Japan
Swimmers at the 1992 Summer Paralympics
Swimmers at the 1996 Summer Paralympics
Swimmers at the 2000 Summer Paralympics
Swimmers at the 2004 Summer Paralympics
Swimmers at the 2008 Summer Paralympics
Medalists at the 1992 Summer Paralympics
Medalists at the 1996 Summer Paralympics
Medalists at the 2000 Summer Paralympics
Medalists at the 2004 Summer Paralympics
Medalists at the 2008 Summer Paralympics
S11-classified Paralympic swimmers
Japanese sportsperson-politicians
Paralympic medalists in swimming
20th-century Japanese people
21st-century Japanese people